Ignacio Anzola (born 28 July 1999) is a Venezuelan football player who plays for ACD Lara as centre back.

Career

Zamora
On 28 August 2019 it was confirmed, that Anzola had joined Spanish club Zamora CF. He left the club by the end of the year without playing a single game, after five months he returns to ACD Lara.

References

External links

1999 births
Living people
Venezuelan footballers
Venezuela under-20 international footballers
Venezuelan expatriate footballers
Association football defenders
Venezuelan Primera División players
Asociación Civil Deportivo Lara players
Zamora CF footballers
Venezuelan people of Italian descent
Sportspeople from Barquisimeto
Venezuelan expatriate sportspeople in Spain
Expatriate footballers in Spain